The 2011 ITF Roller Open was a professional tennis tournament played on clay courts. It was the 11th edition of the tournament which was part of the 2011 ITF Women's Circuit. It took place in Pétange, Luxembourg between 18 and 24 July 2011.

WTA entrants

Seeds

 1 Rankings are as of July 11, 2011.

Other entrants
The following players received wildcards into the singles main draw:
  Natela Dzalamidze
  Fiona Gervais
  Melanie Maietti
  Claudine Schaul

The following players received entry from the qualifying draw:
  Sina Haas
  Mervana Jugić-Salkić
  Conny Perrin
  Vivienne Vierin

The following players received entry by a lucky loser:
  Nicola Geuer

Champions

Singles

 Mathilde Johansson def.  Petra Cetkovská, 7–5, 6–3

Doubles

 Johanna Larsson /  Jasmin Wöhr def.  Kristina Barrois /  Anna-Lena Grönefeld, 7–6(7–2), 6–4

External links
Official Website
ITF Search 

ITF Roller Open
ITF Roller Open
2011 in Luxembourgian tennis